I Oughtta Give You a Shot in the Head for Making Me Live in This Dump is the debut album by American alternative rock band Shivaree, released by Capitol Records in 1999. It contains the song "Goodnight Moon", which appears on the soundtrack to the 2004 film Kill Bill: Volume 2.

Track listing
 "Cannibal King" (Frank Ebb, Paul Klein, Larry Coleman) – 0:48
 "Bossa Nova" (Ambrosia Parsley) – 3:28
 "Daring Lousy Guy" (Parsley, Duke McVinnie) – 4:15
 "Arlington Girl" (Parsley, Greg Lastrapes) – 6:58
 "Oh, No" (Tracy Thielen) – 3:23
 "Lunch" (Parsley) – 4:44
 "Goodnight Moon" (Parsley, McVinnie) – 4:04
 "I Don't Care" (Parsley, McVinnie, Mia Sharp) – 4:38
 "Pimp" (Parsley, McVinnie, Danny McGough) – 3:31
 "Idiot Waltz" (Parsley, McVinnie) – 3:02
 "Ash Wednesday" (Parsley) – 0:51
 "Arrivederci" (Parsley) – 1:44

Personnel
Ambrosia Parsley – Vocals
Duke McVinnie – Guitar
Danny McGough – Keyboards

Chart performance

Certifications and sales

References

1999 debut albums
Capitol Records albums
Shivaree (band) albums
Albums produced by Joe Henry